Lost Marbles & Exploded Evidence is a collection of B-sides and rarities from the band Enon. It was released February 22, 2005.

Track listing
 "Knock that Door"
 "The Nightmare of Atomic Men"
 "Adalania (Not So Fair)"
 "Drowning Appointments"
 "Normal is Happening"
 "Grain of Assault"
 "Genie's Got Her Bag"
 "Kanon"
 "Blow Infinite Ways"
 "Tilt You Up!"
 "Marbles Explode"
 "Raisin Heart"
 "Evidence"
 "Fly South"
 "Making Merry! Merry!"
 "Party Favor"

External links
Enon.tv official website
Lost Marbles & Exploded Evidence at Amazon.com

Albums produced by Dave Sardy
Enon (band) albums
2005 compilation albums
Touch and Go Records compilation albums
B-side compilation albums